The Abtao class were four submarines of the Peruvian Navy that entered service between 1954 and 1957. They are also known as the Lobo class and the Dos de Mayo class and were constructed in the United States to a design based upon the United States Navy's . They were the last submarines to be constructed by the United States for the export market. All four submarines were powered by a diesel-electric system and armed with six  torpedo tubes. Two of the submarines also mounted a  /25 caliber gun. The four submarines, initially named for animals, were all renamed in 1957 for famous Peruvian battles. Beginning in 1991, the submarines were taken out of service, with the last decommissioned in 1999. One, is a museum ship located in Lima, Peru.

Design and description
The Abtao class were a modified version of the United States World War II  design.

The Abtao class had a maximum speed of  when surfaced and  submerged.

The class was armed with six  torpedo tubes with four located in the bow and two aft. Two vessels of the class, Abtao and Dos de Mayo, had a /25 caliber gun mounted abaft the sail. The gun is manually sighted. All four submarines were equipped with SS-2A radar and BQR-3 and BQA-1A sonar. In 1981, their batteries were replaced and following that, Thomson Sintra Eledone active/passive intercept sonar was installed. They had a complement of 40 officers and ratings.

Ships

Construction and career
The Peruvian Navy initially ordered two submarines from Electric Boat on 8 December 1951 based on the United States Navy's Mackerel design. The first two were laid down at the yard in Groton, Connecticut on 12 May 1952 and two more on 27 October 1955. The four submarines were initially named for animals (Lobo, Tiburón, Atun and Merlin). The class was initially known as the Lobo class, and later as the Dos de Mayo class. However, a decree in April 1957 by the President of Peru, Manuel Prado Ugarteche, ordered that the names of the vessels be changed to those of famous Peruvian battles. Lobo became Dos de Mayo, Tiburón became Abtao, Atun became Angamos and Merlin became Iquique. Abtao was the first to launch in October 1953 and commission in February 1954 and Iquique the last to launch in February 1957 and commission in October 1957. They were the last submarines constructed by the United States for the export market.

Abtao and Dos de Mayo underwent a refit at Groton in 1965 and Angamos and Iquique in 1968. In 1988, Abtao took part in the rescue of the crew of the submarine  which had sunk after a collision with the fishing vessel Kiowa Maru. Angamos was taken out of service in 1990, followed by Iquique in 1993. Abtao was removed from service on 10 May 1999 and placed in reserve. The ship was removed from naval service in 2000 and converted into a museum ship in 2004 in Lima, Peru. Dos de Mayo was the last ship to be removed from service in 1999.

Citations

References 
 
 
 
 
 
 
 

Submarines of the Peruvian Navy
Submarine classes